William Conyers Herring (November 15, 1914 – July 23, 2009) was an American physicist. He was a Professor of Applied Physics at Stanford University and the Wolf Prize in Physics recipient in 1984/5.

Academic career
Conyers Herring completed his Ph.D. in physics from Princeton University in 1937, submitting a dissertation entitled On Energy Coincidences in the Theory of Brillouin Zones under the direction of Eugene Wigner. In 1946, he joined the technical staff of Bell Laboratories in Murray Hill, New Jersey, where he remained until 1978. Then, he joined the faculty at Stanford University.

Contributions
Conyers Herring played a major role in the development of solid state physics.

He laid the foundations of band structure calculations of metals and semiconductors, culminating in the discovery of the Orthogonalized Plane Wave Method (O.P.W.) in 1940. He was years ahead of his time in this contribution. A great deal of modern solid state physics as produced today stems from this original and early paper.

In 1937, he predicted the existence of Weyl semimetal, materials that display Weyl quasiparticles, which were experimentally demonstrated in 2015.

His influence on the development of solid state physics extends to a deep understanding of many facets such as surface physics, of thermionic emission, of transport phenomena in semiconductors and of collective excitations in solids such as spin waves.

He created the theoretical physics division at Bell Telephone Laboratory. Because of this, the total research effort at this institution and brought about much of the most original research in condensed matter physics during the latter half of the 20th century.

He has also been most influential in promoting international cooperation among scientists and through his character and his personal example, he has exemplified a somewhat unattainable ideal of how a research scholar in any field should operate.

He has contributed to religion and science discussions.  He has stated about God that "Things such as truth, goodness, even happiness, are achievable by virtue of a force that is always present, in the here and now and available to me personally".

Awards and honors
In June 1954 he was one of twenty scientists under the age of forty identified by Fortune Magazine as "top young scientists in U. S. universities and industry". In 1984/85 Conyers Herring was awarded the Wolf Prize in Physics along with Philippe Nozieres for "their major contributions to the fundamental theory of solids, especially of the behaviour of electrons in metals". In 1980 he was awarded the NAS Award for Scientific Reviewing from the National Academy of Sciences.

See also
 Holstein–Herring method
 Nabarro–Herring creep

References

External links
 
 Profile of Conyers Herring
 The contributions of Conyers Herring
 Oral History interview transcript with Conyers Herring 5 August 2000, American Institute of Physics, Niels Bohr Library and Archives 
 Oral History interview transcript with Conyers Herring 23 July 1974, American Institute of Physics, Niels Bohr Library and Archives 
 Stanford Obituary of Conyers Herring
National Academy of Sciences Biographical Memoir

1914 births
2009 deaths
Stanford University Department of Applied Physics faculty
Princeton University alumni
Wolf Prize in Physics laureates
Scientists at Bell Labs
Members of the United States National Academy of Sciences
Fellows of the American Physical Society
20th-century American physicists
Condensed matter physicists
People from Schenectady County, New York
Scientists from New York (state)
Oliver E. Buckley Condensed Matter Prize winners